Joanne Fenn (née Mersh; born 19 October 1974 in Leytonstone London), attended Connaught School for Girls and is an English singer-songwriter and is a former Olympic middle-distance runner.

Sporting career
Fenn was English schools 300m hurdles champion and later competed in the 400-metre hurdles and heptathlon. After a series of injuries she changed to the 800 metres with her breakthrough season in 2002. She was a member of the Wood ford Green with Essex Ladies athletic club.

At the 2002 Commonwealth Games in Manchester she ran her first sub 2-minute performance with 1:59.86 .

In 2004 Fenn won the 800m bronze medal at the World Indoor Championships in Budapest, Hungary. She also broke the 1000 m British Record before Kelly Holmes regained it later that same year. In the 800m at the 2004 Summer Olympics in Athens, Greece, where Fenn finished fifth in her semi-final and did not qualify for the final.

Fenn had a serious knee injury and major operation on a grapefruit-sized cyst in 2006 and split from her longtime coach in late 2007. She then spent time in Lausanne to work with Trent Sterling a Canadian middle distance coach with a view to competing in 2008 Olympic Games but she did not qualify and subsequently retired.

Fenn is a special speaker for 21st Century Legacy, a charity set up by David Hemery as part of the 2012 legacy. In this role she visits schools up and down the country to inspire and engage with children promoting the Be the Best you can Be programme.

Singing career
Fenn began her singing career in a local band, The Business, during her early career and was offered a place on the BBC talent show Fame Academy.

External links

Olympics bio
Athletics links interview with n
Power of 10 profile

1974 births
Living people
English female middle-distance runners
Athletes (track and field) at the 2004 Summer Olympics
Olympic athletes of Great Britain
People from Leytonstone
World Athletics Championships athletes for Great Britain
Commonwealth Games competitors for England
Athletes (track and field) at the 2002 Commonwealth Games